The Sanitary Laundry Company Building is a historic building located at Baltimore, Maryland, United States. It is a five-bay wide, five-story brick loft building constructed in 1883. The façade features a cast-iron storefront at street level and the elaborate decorative brickwork and terra cotta ornamentation on the upper floors reflect the influence of the Queen Anne style. It was built originally as a slaughterhouse and meat packing plant until 1897, when it was converted to a commercial laundry.

The Sanitary Laundry Company Building was listed on the National Register of Historic Places in 1994.

References

External links
, including photo from 1997, at Maryland Historical Trust

Cast-iron architecture in Baltimore
Industrial buildings and structures on the National Register of Historic Places in Baltimore
Industrial buildings completed in 1883
Queen Anne architecture in Maryland
1883 establishments in Maryland